Clark Moses Leiblee (November 2, 1877 – August 20, 1917) was an American track and field athlete who competed at the 1900 Summer Olympics in Paris, France. He also competed in intercollegiate track for the University of Michigan. He was also on the roster of the 1899 Michigan Wolverines football team as a halfback.

Biography
He was born in November 2, 1877 in Troy, Pennsylvania.

Leiblee competed in the 100 metres event, placing eighth overall. He won his first-round heat with a time of 11.4 seconds before finishing his semifinal heat in second place to Walter Tewksbury (who matched the world record of 10.8 seconds in the race). This put Leiblee in the repechage; a third-place finish in the six-man field put him in eighth place overall.

He died in Tipton, Indiana on August 20, 1917.

References

External links 

 De Wael, Herman. Herman's Full Olympians: "Athletics 1900". Accessed 18 March 2006.
 

1877 births
1917 deaths
People from Bradford County, Pennsylvania
Athletes (track and field) at the 1900 Summer Olympics
Olympic track and field athletes of the United States
Michigan Wolverines football players
Players of American football from Pennsylvania
American male sprinters
Road incident deaths in Indiana